Inoxydable is the first studio album by Canadian singer Marie-Mai, released on 28 September 2004. The album was then released in France on April 10, 2006.  The album received platinum certification for selling more than 120,000 copies.

Track listing

Music videos
Il faut que tu t'en ailles
Tu t'en fous
Encore une nuit
Rien

Personnel
 Marie-Mai – Vocals, Composer
 Jean-Pierre Bouchard – Composer
 Romano Musumarra – Composer
 Luc Plamondon – Composer
 Pete Lesperance – Arranger
 Rob Wells – Arranger, Clavier, Programming
 Jeff Smallwood – Arranger, Guitar, Sound Recording
 Andy VanDette – Mastering
 Robert Langlois – Bass

References 

Marie-Mai albums
2004 albums